The Whistler Range is a mountain range in Eureka County, Nevada.

References 

Mountain ranges of Nevada
Mountain ranges of Eureka County, Nevada